Space defense may refer to:
 Space warfare
 Asteroid-impact avoidance
 Alien invasion